Solanum chrysophyllum is a flowering plant species in the nightshade family (Solanaceae). It probably belongs to a group of species formerly in Solanum but nowadays placed in Lycianthes, though its exact identity and name remain undetermined.

It is endemic to Ecuador. Its status is insufficiently known.

Footnotes

References
  [2008]: "Solanum chrysophyllum". Retrieved 2008-SEP-29.

chrysophyllum
Flora of Ecuador
Data deficient plants
Taxonomy articles created by Polbot